The Moon Township Police Department (MTPD) is a medium-sized municipal police department in Moon Township, Allegheny County, Pennsylvania.

The Moon Township Police Department has 30 sworn police officers and 15 administrative personnel and a dozen more volunteers. The police department has a fleet of over a dozen patrol vehicles. They have an all-Ford fleet operating exclusively Ford Police Interceptor Utility vehicles.

See also 
 Death of Jonny Gammage
 List of law enforcement agencies in Pennsylvania
 List of law enforcement agencies
 Law enforcement in the United States

References 

Municipal police departments of Pennsylvania
Government of Allegheny County, Pennsylvania
Police Department